In formal language theory, in particular in algorithmic learning theory, a class C of languages has finite thickness if every string is contained in at most finitely many languages in C. This condition was introduced by Dana Angluin as a sufficient condition for C being identifiable in the limit.

The related notion of M-finite thickness

Given a language L and an indexed class C = { L1, L2, L3, ... } of languages, a member language Lj ∈ C is called a minimal concept of L within C if L ⊆ Lj, but not L ⊊ Li ⊆ Lj for any Li ∈ C.
The class C is said to satisfy the MEF-condition if every finite subset D of a member language Li ∈ C has a minimal concept Lj ⊆ Li. Symmetrically, C is said to satisfy the MFF-condition if every nonempty finite set D has at most finitely many minimal concepts in C. Finally, C is said to have M-finite thickness if it satisfies both the MEF- and the MFF-condition.

Finite thickness implies M-finite thickness. However, there are classes that are of M-finite thickness but not of finite thickness (for example, any class of languages C = { L1, L2, L3, ... } such that L1 ⊆ L2 ⊆ L3 ⊆  ...).

References 

Formal languages